Hyptis is a genus of flowering plant in the family Lamiaceae. These plants, known commonly as bushmints, are widespread in tropical North and South America, as well as parts of West Africa. There are 150 species, which may be annual or perennial herb to shrub. Recently, several genera were segregated from Hyptis (Harley & Pastore 2012).

Selected species:
 Hyptis alata - clustered bushmint, musky mint
 Hyptis argutifolia
 Hyptis atrorubens - marubio oscuro
 Hyptis brevipes
 Hyptis capitata - false ironwort, wild hops
 Hyptis crenata - Brazilian mint
 Hyptis diversifolia
 Hyptis emoryi
 Hyptis escobilla - bayamon
 Hyptis florida
 Hyptis goyazensis
 Hyptis hirsuta
 Hyptis hygrobia
 Hyptis lantanifolia - island bushmint
 Hyptis lappacea
 Hyptis lorentziana
 Hyptis pseudoglauca
 Hyptis recurvata
 Hyptis suaveolens
 Hyptis velutina

Gallery

References

External links
Jepson Manual Treatment

 
Lamiaceae genera
Taxonomy articles created by Polbot